David Ingram (born April 25, 1944) is an American linguist and Emeritus Professor of Linguistics at Arizona State University. He is best known for his works on first language acquisition and phonology.
A festschrift in his honor titled On under-reported monolingual child phonology edited by Elena Babatsouli was published in 2020.

Books
Phonological Disability in Children
First Language Acquisition: Method, Description and Explanation
Procedures for the Phonological Analysis of Children's Language

References

External links
David Ingram

Linguists from the United States
American phonologists
Phoneticians
1944 births
Living people
Stanford University alumni
Arizona State University
Semanticists